Chifeng Road is a station on Shanghai Metro Line 3.

References

Line 3, Shanghai Metro
Shanghai Metro stations in Hongkou District
Railway stations in China opened in 2000
Railway stations in Shanghai